Walk Through Fire is the twelfth album by English heavy metal band Raven. It was released on 24 March 2009 for the Japanese label King Records.

Track listing
 "Intro" – 0:52
 "Against the Grain" – 3:52
 "Breaking You Down" – 3:02
 "Under Your Radar" – 4:05
 "Walk Through Fire" – 3:20
 "Bulldozer" – 3:53
 "Long Day's Journey" – 4:50
 "Trainwreck" – 3:34
 "Grip" – 3:32
 "Running Around in Circles" – 3:40
 "Hard Road" – 3:45
 "Armageddon" – 6:31
 "Attitude" – 3:24
 "Necessary Evil" – 3:56
 "Space Station #5" (Montrose cover) – 4:01

European edition bonus track
"The King" (live) – 4:53

Personnel
John Gallagher – bass, vocals
Mark Gallagher – guitar
Joe Hasselvander – drums

2009 albums
Raven (British band) albums
King Records (Japan) albums
SPV/Steamhammer albums